Statistics of North American Soccer League in season 1975. This was the 8th season of the NASL.

Overview
The league comprised 20 teams with the Tampa Bay Rowdies winning the championship.

Pelé joined the New York Cosmos in 1975.

1975 was the first year the league used the term Soccer Bowl for their championship game.

Changes from the previous season

Rules changes
The 1975 season saw the removal of tie games. Matches that were level after 90 minutes would go to 15 minutes of sudden death overtime, and then onto penalty kicks if needed. It would not be until 2000 that a top-tier American soccer league would again allow matches to end in a draw.

New teams
Chicago Sting
Hartford Bicentennials
Portland Timbers
San Antonio Thunder
Tampa Bay Rowdies

Teams folding
None

Teams moving
None

Name changes
Toronto Metros to Toronto Metros-Croatia*
*after merger with Toronto Croatia of National Soccer League

Regular season
W = Wins, L = Losses, GF = Goals For, GA = Goals Against, PT= point system

6 points for a win,
1 point for a shootout win,
0 points for a loss,
1 point for each regulation goal scored up to three per game.
-Premiers (most points). -Other playoff teams.

NASL League Leaders

Scoring

*(2 points per goal, 1 per assist)

Goalkeeping

*(1,260 minutes minimum)

NASL All-Stars

Playoffs
All playoff games in all rounds including Soccer Bowl '75 were single game elimination match ups.

Bracket

Quarterfinals

Semifinals

Soccer Bowl '75

1975 NASL Champions: Tampa Bay Rowdies

Post season awards
Most Valuable Player: Steve David, Miami
Coach of the year: John Sewell, St. Louis
Rookie of the year: Chris Bahr, Philadelphia

References

External links
Complete Results and Standings

 
North American Soccer League (1968–1984) seasons
1975 in American soccer leagues
1975 in Canadian soccer